Stockton Street Subway may refer to:

 Central Subway (San Francisco), running under Stockton Street in San Francisco
 Stockton Street Tunnel, currently carrying automobile traffic in San Francisco